Skouze Hill is a hill located in Athens. It is also the name of a small neighbourhood surrounding the hill.

In Antiquity, it was dedicated to and named after "Demeter Euchloös". Before the revolution of 1821 however, the Skouze family owned large properties in the area, which was consequently named after it.

Hills of Athens
Neighbourhoods in Athens